The United People's Party (ENP) is a political party in Bulgaria. The chairwoman of the party is Valentina Vasileva-Filadelfevs.

History

The party ran in the April 2021 election as part of the Stand Up! Mafia, Get Out! coalition, and won three seats.

External links
 Party website

References

Liberal parties in Bulgaria
Political parties established in 2007